The 1998–99 Deutsche Eishockey Liga season was the 5th season of the Deutsche Eishockey Liga.

Adler Mannheim continued their dominance in German ice-hockey and became the DEL Champion for the third time in row, winning a German title for the fourth time in their history. The league had only 14 teams, as the Kaufbeurer Adler and Düsseldorfer EG were forced out due to financial reasons.

Regular season
The first 8 placed teams qualified for the playoffs.

GP = Games played, W = Win, OTW = Overtime Win, OTL = Overtime loss, L = Loss
 = Qualified for playoffs  = Season ended

Player Awards

Playoff 
The playoffs were played in a best-of-five mode.

Quarterfinals 
The quarterfinals were played starting March 12, 1999.

OT = Overtime; SO = Shootout

Semifinals 
The semifinals were played starting March 26, 1999. The regular season best placed team left played against the worst, and the second best vs. third best.

OT = Overtime; SO = Shootout

Finals 
The finals were played starting April 18 with the Nürnberg Ice Tigers playing home first, due to better regular season placement.

OT = Overtime; SO = Shootout

With the last game, Adler Mannheim continued their dominance in German ice-hockey and became the DEL Champion for the third time in row, winning a German title for the fourth time in their history.

References

1
Ger
Deutsche Eishockey Liga seasons